Tyus Bowser (born May 23, 1995) is an American football outside linebacker for the Baltimore Ravens of the National Football League (NFL). He played college football at Houston.

Early years
Bowser attended John Tyler High School in Tyler, Texas, where he played for the Lions football team. As a senior, he had 59 tackles and 24 sacks. He committed to the University of Houston to play college football.

College career
Bowser played college football at Houston from 2013 to 2016.

Bowser made his collegiate debut on August 30 against Southern and recorded two tackles. On September 21, he recorded his first two collegiate sacks and had his first interception in a win over Rice. As a freshman in 2013, he had 26 total tackles, 5.0 sacks, one interception, two passes defensed, and one forced fumble. As a sophomore in 2014, he had 13 total tackles and three sacks. As a junior in 2015, he had 51 total tackles, six sacks, one interception, two passes defensed, two fumble recoveries, and one forced fumble.

Bowser missed five games his senior season due to a fractured orbital bone that he suffered during an fight with a teammate. Despite the injury, he led the team with eight sacks. Bowser finished his collegiate career with 137 tackles and 22.5 sacks.

Bowser also played in four games over two seasons for the Houston Cougars basketball team.

Professional career
Bowser received an invitation to Senior Bowl and made four solo tackles as a part of the South team. He raised his draft stock with his Senior Bowl performance and helped the South defeat the North 16–15. He attended the NFL Combine and completed the majority of drills, but opted to skip the short shuttle and three-cone drill. Bowser also participated at Houston's Pro Day and chose to only run the short shuttle and positional drills. NFL draft experts and analysts projected Bowser to be a first or second round pick. He was ranked the fifth best outside linebacker available in the draft by NFLDraftScout.com, the sixth best linebacker by ESPN, and was ranked the twelfth best edge rusher by Sports Illustrated.

Baltimore Ravens
The Baltimore Ravens selected Bowser in the second round with the 47th overall pick in the 2017 NFL Draft. He was the third outside linebacker to be selected. On May 5, 2017, the Ravens signed Bowser to a four-year, $5.57 million contract with $3.37 million guaranteed and a signing bonus of $2.19 million.

2017 season
Bowser made his NFL debut in the 2017 season opener against the Cincinnati Bengals. He recorded one tackle in the 20–0 victory over the Bengals. He recorded his first NFL interception in Week 2 against quarterback Kevin Hogan of the Cleveland Browns, returning it for 27 yards and setting up a critical touchdown by the Ravens' offense before halftime. Overall, in his rookie season, he finished with three sacks, nine tackles, one interception, and three passes defensed.

2019 season
In Week 10 of the 2019 season, Bowser recorded a 33-yard fumble return for a touchdown in the 49–13 victory over the Cincinnati Bengals. He followed that up with a two-sack performance in a 41–7 victory over the Houston Texans in the next game.

2020 season
Bowser was placed on the reserve/COVID-19 list by the team on November 3, 2020, and activated four days later.

2021 season
On March 16, 2021, Bowser re-signed with the Ravens, on a four-year, $22 million deal, with the potential to rise to $27 million. In the final seconds in the fourth quarter Bowser sacked Andy Dalton for a loss of 18 yards, which yielded a 16–13 win over the Chicago Bears on November 21, 2021. The following week, Bowser recorded a sack on Baker Mayfield, as well as a game sealing tackle on fourth down. On January 14, 2022, Bowser underwent surgery to repair a torn Achilles.

2022 season
On August 26, 2022, Bowser was placed on the reserve/PUP list to start the season. He was activated on November 1.

NFL career statistics

References

External links
Baltimore Ravens bio
Houston Cougars football bio
Houston Cougars basketball bio

1995 births
Living people
Sportspeople from Tyler, Texas
Players of American football from Texas
American football linebackers
American football defensive ends
Houston Cougars football players
Houston Cougars men's basketball players
Baltimore Ravens players
Basketball players from Texas
American men's basketball players